Kerina Smallhorn (born 19 July 1972) is a retired female field hockey player from Australia who represented South Australia and New South Wales in the National Hockey League and was an Australian Under 21 Junior World Cup Team, Silver medalist in Barcelona in 1993. Smallhorn also represented the Australian Institute of Sport with tours to the UK, Spain and Germany in the early 1990s.

State representation
1990–1993 S.A. Diet Coke Suns, Women’s National Hockey League (NHL) Team
1990–1993 – Under 21 S.A Team
1991 – Captain, Under 21 SA Team
1994 - South Australian Sports Institute at Four Nations Tournament

National representation
1991 – Australian Institute of Sport (AIS) Overseas Tour – England, Ireland, Spain
1992 - Australian Under 21 Junior World Cup Qualifying series
1993 - A.I.S. Overseas Tour – Germany, Madrid.
1993 - Australian Under 21 Junior World Cup Team - Silver medalist – Barcelona, Spain.

Notable achievements
1990, 1991 – South Australian Women's Hockey Assoc (SAWHA) - Team of the Year
1992, 1993 - South Australian Sports Institute (SASI) -  Most Outstanding Aboriginal Athlete.
1995 – New South Wales Institute of Spot - Scholarship Holder

Education career
Smallhorn, a mother of two, now living in NSW completed her Bachelor of Education degree majoring in PDHPE and now works as a teacher aiming to pass on what she has learned and experienced from sport. Karina, who has a proud Aboriginal background, identifies her father – the eldest of 11 children – as the most profound influence and biggest inspiration in her life for his ability to rise from adversity and hardship and to provide his children with an education. Smallhorn has stated she hopes to assist every student she teaches who struggles with the concept of physical activity, to be empowered by feelings of success which will lead to positive lifelong outcomes in their lives.

References

1972 births
Living people
Australian female field hockey players
20th-century Australian women
Indigenous Australian sportspeople
Australian Institute of Sport field hockey players
Field hockey people from South Australia
Field hockey people from New South Wales